MusicalSplaining is a podcast series hosted by filmmaker Kaveh Taherian and writer Angelina Meehan. Each episode, the two hosts are introduced to a different musical and they discuss its plot, themes and production. The podcast is pitched as a show for both musical-lovers and musical-haters. Prior to 2022, the show was hosted by Taherian and Lindsay Ellis.

Overview 
The format of the show leans into the divisive nature of musicals, with Ellis or Meehan assuming the role of a musicals fan and Taherian a theatre skeptic. The episodes cover a mixture of classic musicals like The Phantom of the Opera and The King and I, and newer musicals including Frozen and SpongeBob SquarePants.

Ellis and Taherian attended film school together at USC. Ellis stated that she chose Taherian as a co-host because he could balance his performative anger at musicals with a critical tone. The two hosts are sometimes joined by a guest host, which have included Hank Green and fellow YouTuber Jenny Nicholson.

Two months into the podcast, theatres in California shut down due to the COVID-19 pandemic. In an interview with OnStage, Ellis described how the hosts had originally planned to tour around the state to see musicals in theatres, but COVID-19 "totally wrecked" those plans. They have since relied on proshoots to watch and review each musical.

The podcast is available via Apple Podcasts, Spotify, Google Play, Stitcher, Nebula., and Podchaser.

On December 17, 2021, in "The Lion King" episode, it was announced that the show was going on an indefinite hiatus following Ellis's retirement from online content creation. The show returned on January 18, 2022 with an episode on the film Tick, Tick... Boom! with frequent guest and Ellis's former co-writer Angelina Meehan taking over as the podcast's new co-host.

Episodes

References 

2020 podcast debuts
American podcasts
Audio podcasts
Music podcasts